The boopis razorbelly minnow (Salmostoma boopis) is a species of cyprinid fish in the genus Salmostoma. It is widespread throughout the Western Ghats of India

References

 

boopis
Fish described in 1874
Taxobox binomials not recognized by IUCN